The 1964–65 Boston Bruins season was the 41st season of operation for the Boston Bruins of the National Hockey League (NHL). The Bruins did not qualify for the playoffs.

Offseason

Regular season
On January 27, 1965, Ulf Sterner, the first European trained player, made his debut in the National Hockey League for the New York Rangers in a game versus the Boston Bruins.

Final standings

Record vs. opponents

Schedule and results

Playoffs

Player statistics

Regular season
Scoring

Goaltending

Awards and records

Transactions

Draft picks
Boston's draft picks at the 1964 NHL Entry Draft held at the Queen Elizabeth Hotel in Montreal, Quebec.

Farm teams

See also
1964–65 NHL season

References

External links

Boston Bruins
Boston Bruins
Boston Bruins seasons
Boston Bruins
Boston Bruins
1960s in Boston